

Present

Regular season and March Madness
 Dan Bonner (game analyst)
 Andrew Catalon (play-by-play)
 Seth Davis (studio analyst)
 Spero Dedes (play-by-play)
 Ian Eagle (play-by-play)
 Greg Gumbel (lead studio host)
 Kevin Harlan (play-by-play)
 Grant Hill (lead game analyst)
 Dana Jacobson (studio host and sideline reporter)
 Clark Kellogg (studio analyst)
 Steve Lappas (analyst)
 Tom McCarthy (play-by-play)
 Jim Nantz (lead play by play)
 Brad Nessler (play-by-play)
 Bill Raftery (lead game analyst)
 AJ Ross (sideline reporter)
 Jon Rothstein (sideline reporter)
 Jim Spanarkel (game analyst)
 Gene Steratore (rules analyst)
 Wally Szczerbiak (studio analyst)
 Evan Washburn (sideline reporter)
 Tracy Wolfson (lead sideline reporter)
 Adam Zucker (studio host)

Regular season only announcers
 Pete Gillen (analyst)
 Mike Gminski (game analyst)
 Danny Granger (studio analyst)
 Clark Kellogg (game analyst)
 John Sadak (play-by-play)
 Rich Waltz (play-by-play)

March Madness only announcers
 Brian Anderson (play-by-play)
 Debbie Antonelli (game analyst)
 Charles Barkley (studio analyst)
 Lisa Byington (sideline reporter and play-by-play)
 Rex Chapman (studio analyst)
 Brendan Haywood (studio and game analyst)
 Steve Lavin (game analyst)
 Jim Jackson (game analyst)
 Avery Johnson (game analyst)
 Ernie Johnson (studio host)
 Andy Katz (insider)
 Nabil Karim (studio host)
 Allie LaForce (sideline reporter)
 Adam Lefkoe (game break host)
 Candace Parker (studio analyst)
 Lauren Shehadi (sideline reporter)
 Steve Smith (game analyst)
 Kenny Smith (studio analyst)
 Stan Van Gundy (game analyst)

Past

Play-by-play
 Greg Anthony (game analyst)
 Gary Bender (1981–1986; lead play by play, 1981–1984)
 Carter Blackburn (play-by-play)
 Jay Bilas (game analyst)
 Craig Bolerjack (play-by-play)
 Tim Brando (play-by-play)
 Tim Brant (1986–1990)
 Irv Brown - During the telecast of the March 14, 1982 Idaho-Iowa game, Fred White started this game on play-by-play with Irv Brown as analyst, but White came down with laryngitis a few minutes into the game. So Brown shifted to play-by-play (for the first time ever) and George Raveling (Washington State's head coach) came out of the stands to serve as analyst for the remainder of the game. 
 Bob Carpenter
 Don Criqui (play-by-play)
 Jim Durham (1997–1998)
 Mike Emrick (1994–1995)
 Dick Enberg (1999–2010)
 Frank Glieber (1981–1985)
 Mike Gorman (1992–1997)
 Jim Henderson (1990–1991)
 Frank Herzog
 Gus Johnson (play-by-play)
 Sean McDonough (1991–1999)
 Brent Musburger (1985–1990)
 Mike Patrick (1986–1987)
 Mel Proctor (1991–1993)
 Bob Rathbun (1988–1989, 1995–1996)
 Ted Robinson (1993–1998)
 Tim Ryan (1982–1998)
 Dave Sims (1993–1995)
 Pat Summerall (1985)
 Michele Tafoya
 Gary Thorne (1996–1997)
 Fred White 
 Steve Zabriskie
 Marv Albert

Color commentators
 Kareem Abdul-Jabbar (2002–2003)
 Stephen Bardo
 Rolando Blackman (1997–2000)
 Dale Brown
 James Brown (1985–1986)
 Quinn Buckner (1988–1993, 1994–1997)
 Doug Collins
 Larry Conley
 Denny Crum - During the 1996 CUSA title game, Al McGuire lost his voice. So CBS got Louisville coach Crum (who was in the arena) to join Tim Ryan on the broadcast crew in relief of McGuire.
 Billy Cunningham (1986–1991)
 Derrek Dickey (1992–1997)
 Larry Farmer (1992–1994)
 Eddie Fogler (2001–2002)
 Bill Foster
 Jack Givens
 Matt Guokas (2001–2004)
 Tom Heinsohn
 Greg Kelser (1993–1998)
 Steve Kerr (2011–2014)
 Al McGuire (1992–1999)
 Ann Meyers
 Reggie Miller
 Digger Phelps (1991–1993)
 Rick Pitino (2000–2001)
 George Raveling (1994–1998)
 Lynn Shackelford
 Jon Sundvold (1996–2002)
 Reggie Theus (1994–1995)
 Bill Walton (2001)
 Bucky Waters (1988–1989)
 James Worthy (1999–2001)

Studio hosts
 Brent Musburger (1981–1985)
 Jim Nantz (1985–2005)
 Pat O'Brien (1990–1997)
 Sam Ryan (2006–2011)
 Dick Stockton (1984–1985)

Studio analysts
 Quinn Buckner (1994–1996)
 Rex Chapman (2013 NCAA Tournament)
 Mateen Cleaves (2014–2015)
 Mike Francesca (1989–1993)
 Mike Krzyzewski (1993 and 1995 NCAA Tournaments)
 Grant Hill (2014 NCAA Tournament)
 Rick Majerus (1999 NCAA Tournament)
 Digger Phelps (1992–1993)
 Rick Pitino (1994 NCAA Tournament, 2000–2001)
 Bill Raftery
 Dean Smith (1998 NCAA Tournament)
 John Thompson (1993 NCAA Tournament)
 Dwyane Wade

Feature reporters
 Bonnie Bernstein
 Dan Bonner
 Armen Keteyian
 Michele Tafoya
 Andrea Joyce
 Solomon Wilcots

Sideline reporters
 Bonnie Bernstein
 Dan Bonner
 Charles Davis
 Jamie Erdahl
 Andrea Joyce
 Armen Keteyian
 Otis Livingston (2012–2014)
 Rachel Nichols (2013-2015)
 Sam Ryan
 Craig Sager (2011–2014)
 John Schriffen
 Lesley Visser (2004–2012)
 Michele Tafoya
 Solomon Wilcots

NCAA Tournament commentary crews

2010

 Studio Host: Greg Gumbel
 Studio Analysts: Greg Anthony and Seth Davis

 Jim Nantz/Clark Kellogg/Tracy Wolfson
 Dick Enberg/Jay Bilas/Sam Ryan
 Verne Lundquist/Bill Raftery/Lesley Visser
 Gus Johnson/Len Elmore
 Kevin Harlan/Dan Bonner
 Ian Eagle/Jim Spanarkel
 Tim Brando/Mike Gminski
 Spero Dedes/Bob Wenzel

2000s

2009

 Studio Host: Greg Gumbel
 Studio Analysts: Greg Anthony and Seth Davis

 Jim Nantz/Clark Kellogg/Tracy Wolfson
 Dick Enberg or Carter Blackburn/Jay Bilas
 Verne Lundquist/Bill Raftery/Lesley Visser
 Gus Johnson/Len Elmore/Sam Ryan
 Kevin Harlan/Dan Bonner
 Ian Eagle/Jim Spanarkel
 Tim Brando/Mike Gminski
 Craig Bolerjack/Bob Wenzel

2008
 Jim Nantz/Billy Packer
 Dick Enberg or Carter Blackburn/Jay Bilas
 Verne Lundquist/Bill Raftery
 Gus Johnson/Len Elmore
 Kevin Harlan/Dan Bonner
 Ian Eagle/Jim Spanarkel
 Tim Brando/Mike Gminski
 Craig Bolerjack/Bob Wenzel

2007
 Jim Nantz/Billy Packer
 Dick Enberg/Jay Bilas
 Verne Lundquist/Bill Raftery
 James Brown/Len Elmore
 Gus Johnson/Dan Bonner
 Kevin Harlan/Bob Wenzel
 Ian Eagle/Jim Spanarkel
 Tim Brando/Mike Gminski

2006
 Jim Nantz/Billy Packer
 Dick Enberg/Jay Bilas
 Verne Lundquist/Bill Raftery
 Gus Johnson/Len Elmore
 Kevin Harlan/Dan Bonner
 Ian Eagle/Jim Spanarkel
 Tim Brando/Mike Gminski and Stephen Bardo
 Craig Bolerjack/Bob Wenzel

2005
 Jim Nantz/Billy Packer
 Dick Enberg/Jay Bilas
 Verne Lundquist/Bill Raftery
 Gus Johnson/Len Elmore
 Kevin Harlan/Dan Bonner
 Ian Eagle/Jim Spanarkel
 Tim Brando/Mike Gminski
 Craig Bolerjack/Bob Wenzel

2004
 Jim Nantz/Billy Packer
 Dick Enberg/Matt Guokas
 Verne Lundquist/Bill Raftery
 Gus Johnson/Len Elmore
 Kevin Harlan/Dan Bonner
 Ian Eagle/Jim Spanarkel
 Tim Brando/Mike Gminski
 Craig Bolerjack/Bob Wenzel

2003
 Jim Nantz/Billy Packer
 Dick Enberg/Matt Guokas and Kareem Abdul-Jabbar
 Verne Lundquist/Bill Raftery
 Gus Johnson/Len Elmore
 Kevin Harlan/Jay Bilas
 Craig Bolerjack/Dan Bonner
 Ian Eagle/Jim Spanarkel
 Tim Brando/Bob Wenzel

2002
 Jim Nantz/Billy Packer
 Dick Enberg/Matt Guokas
 Verne Lundquist/Bill Raftery
 Gus Johnson/Dan Bonner
 Kevin Harlan/Jon Sundvold
 Ian Eagle/Jim Spanarkel
 Craig Bolerjack/Bob Wenzel
 Tim Brando/Eddie Fogler

2001
 Jim Nantz/Billy Packer
 Dick Enberg/Bill Walton
 Verne Lundquist/Bill Raftery
 Gus Johnson/Dan Bonner
 Kevin Harlan/Jon Sundvold
 Ian Eagle/Jim Spanarkel
 Tim Brando/Rick Pitino
 Craig Bolerjack/James Worthy

2000
 Jim Nantz/Billy Packer
 Dick Enberg/James Worthy
 Verne Lundquist/Bill Raftery
 Gus Johnson/Dan Bonner
 Kevin Harlan/Jon Sundvold
 Ian Eagle/Jim Spanarkel
 Tim Brando/Rolando Blackman
 Craig Bolerjack/Barry Booker

1990s

1999
 Jim Nantz/Billy Packer
 Sean McDonough/Bill Raftery
 Verne Lundquist/Al McGuire
 Gus Johnson/Dan Bonner
 Kevin Harlan/Jon Sundvold
 Ian Eagle/Jim Spanarkel
 Tim Brando/James Worthy
 Craig Bolerjack/Rolando Blackman

1998
 Jim Nantz/Billy Packer
 Sean McDonough/Bill Raftery
 Tim Brando/Al McGuire
 Gus Johnson/Jon Sundvold
 Tim Ryan/Dan Bonner
 Ian Eagle/Jim Spanarkel
 Jim Durham/Greg Kelser
 Ted Robinson/Rolando Blackman

1997
 Jim Nantz or Bob Carpenter/Billy Packer
 Sean McDonough/Bill Raftery
 Tim Ryan/Al McGuire
 Gus Johnson/Quinn Buckner
 Gary Thorne/Dan Bonner
 Tim Brando/George Raveling
 Mike Gorman/Jon Sundvold
 Ted Robinson/Derrek Dickey

1996
 Jim Nantz or Bob Rathbun/Billy Packer
 Sean McDonough/Bill Raftery
 Tim Ryan/Al McGuire
 Gus Johnson/Quinn Buckner
 Bill Macatee/Dan Bonner
 Tim Brando/Derrek Dickey
 Mike Gorman/George Raveling
 Ted Robinson/Larry Farmer

1995
 Jim Nantz or Dick Stockton/Billy Packer
 Sean McDonough/Bill Raftery
 Tim Ryan/Al McGuire
 Verne Lundquist/Quinn Buckner
 Dave Sims/Dan Bonner
 Mike Emrick/George Raveling
 Mike Gorman/Ann Meyers
 Ted Robinson/Derrek Dickey

1994
 Jim Nantz or James Brown/Billy Packer
 Greg Gumbel/Bill Raftery
 Dick Stockton/Al McGuire
 Verne Lundquist/Dan Bonner or Clark Kellogg
 Tim Ryan/Ann Meyers
 Sean McDonough/Derrek Dickey
 Ted Robinson/Greg Kelser
 Dave Sims/Larry Farmer

1993
 Jim Nantz or James Brown/Billy Packer
 James Brown/Bill Raftery (worked the second weekend only)
 Dick Stockton/Al McGuire
 Verne Lundquist/Clark Kellogg
 Greg Gumbel/Digger Phelps
 Tim Ryan/Ann Meyers
 Mel Proctor/Dan Bonner
 Sean McDonough/Derrek Dickey
 Mike Gorman/Larry Farmer

1992
 Jim Nantz/Billy Packer (spent first weekend in studio)
 Verne Lundquist/Len Elmore
 Dick Stockton/Al McGuire or Greg Kelser
 Greg Gumbel/Quinn Buckner
 James Brown/Bill Raftery
 Tim Ryan/Digger Phelps
 Mel Proctor/Dan Bonner
 Brad Nessler/Ann Meyers
 Sean McDonough/Bill Walton

1991
 Jim Nantz/Billy Packer (spent first weekend in studio)
 Dick Stockton/Billy Cunningham
 James Brown/Bill Raftery
 Greg Gumbel/Quinn Buckner
 Verne Lundquist/Len Elmore
 Tim Ryan or Jim Henderson/Dan Bonner
 Brad Nessler/Mimi Griffin
 Mel Proctor/Jack Givens
 Sean McDonough/Bill Walton

1990
 Brent Musburger/Billy Packer (Musburger's last tournament. CBS fired Musburger day before championship game)
 Dick Stockton/Hubie Brown
 James Brown/Bill Raftery
 Greg Gumbel/Quinn Buckner
 Tim Brant/Len Elmore
 Brad Nessler/Tom Heinsohn

1980s

1989
 Brent Musburger/Billy Packer
 Dick Stockton/Bill Raftery
 Verne Lundquist/Tom Heinsohn
 Tim Brant/Len Elmore
 Greg Gumbel/Quinn Buckner
 Steve Zabriskie/Curry Kirkpatrick

1988
 Brent Musburger/Billy Packer
 Dick Stockton/Billy Cunningham
 Verne Lundquist/Tom Heinsohn
 Tim Brant/Bill Raftery
 Tim Ryan/Curry Kirkpatrick

1987
 Brent Musburger/Billy Packer
 Dick Stockton/Tom Heinsohn
 Verne Lundquist/Billy Cunningham
 Tim Brant/Bill Raftery
 Mike Patrick/Larry Conley

1986
 Brent Musburger or Dick Stockton/Billy Packer
 Gary Bender/Doug Collins
 Dick Stockton/Larry Conley
 Verne Lundquist/Larry Conley or James Brown
 Jim Nantz/Bill Raftery
 Mike Patrick/James Brown

1985
 Brent Musburger or Dick Stockton/Billy Packer
 Gary Bender/Doug Collins
 Frank Glieber/James Brown (Glieber's last tournament for CBS. Glieber died in May 1985)
 Verne Lundquist or Pat Summerall/Larry Conley
 Verne Lundquist/Steve Grote
 Tim Ryan/Bill Raftery

1984
 Gary Bender/Billy Packer
 Frank Glieber/Larry Conley
 Verne Lundquist/Steve Grote
 Dick Stockton/Bill Raftery
 Tim Ryan/Lynn Shackelford
 Frank Herzog/James Brown

1983
 Gary Bender/Billy Packer
 Dick Stockton/Steve Grote
 Frank Glieber/Irv Brown or Larry Conley
 Verne Lundquist/Bill Raftery
 Tim Ryan/Lynn Shackelford
 Frank Herzog/James Brown

1982
 Gary Bender/Billy Packer
 Frank Glieber/Steve Grote
 Bill Foster/George Raveling
 Fred White/Irv Brown and George Raveling (Fred White came down with laryngitis. Irv Brown shifted to play by play and Raveling, then coach at Washington State, came out of the stands to serve as analyst.)
 Verne Lundquist/Dale Brown

References

College Basketball on CBS personalities
CBS